Austerlands is a suburban area of Saddleworth, a civil parish within the Metropolitan Borough of Oldham, in Greater Manchester, England. It occupies a hillside amongst the Pennines, between the villages of Lees and Scouthead. It is traversed by the A62 road.

Historically, Austerlands has been positioned on the West Riding of Yorkshire side of the ancient county boundary with Lancashire.  The chimney of the former Austerlands Mill is a local landmark.

Austerlands is contiguous with Waterhead area of Oldham, the village of Lees and Scouthead and Springhead areas of Saddleworth. For purposes of the Office for National Statistics, Austerlands forms the eastern fringe of the Greater Manchester Urban Area.

See also

Listed buildings in Saddleworth

References

Geography of the Metropolitan Borough of Oldham
Saddleworth